The Two-man competition at the IBSF World Championships 2020 was held on 22 and 23 February 2020.

Results
The first two runs were started on February 22 at 11:30am. The last two runs were held on February 23 at 2:30pm.

References

Two-man